Ruisrock is a rock festival held annually on the island of Ruissalo in Turku, Finland.
Ruisrock, founded in 1970, is the second oldest rock festival in Europe (after Pinkpop) and the oldest in Finland. The festival has attracted international artists throughout its lifetime except around the start of the 2000s (decade), due to the organiser's economic issues.

History
The festival area is divided into two sections, Niittyalue ("meadow section") and Ranta-alue ("beach section").

In 2005, when the German industrial metal band Rammstein performed at the festival, 71,000 visitors attended the festival. In recent years, the number of visitors has fluctuated around 70,000. However, the all-time record was set in 1971, when there were about 100,000 visitors, with artists such as Canned Heat playing.

The 2009 edition of the festival saw a rise in attendance, when during 3 days there was a total of 92,000 visitors. In 2009, musical acts such as Slipknot, Disturbed, Faith No More, Mew, In Flames, Volbeat, Glasvegas, The Sounds, D'espairsRay, and popular domestic artists including Children of Bodom, HIM, Eppu Normaali, Tehosekoitin played at the festival, including the last live performance by The Crash.

In 2010, the festival was celebrating its 40-year anniversary, with popular artists such as Slash and Ozzy Osbourne playing.

In 2016, three reports of rape that occurred at the festival had surfaced and an additional two for sexual harassment. These claims are still under investigation by the Finnish police.

In 2017, 2018 and 2019, the festival gathered 105,000 people in the Ruissalo People's Park during the weekend, and all three days were sold out in each of the three years. The 2020 and 2021 Ruisrocki were canceled due to the coronavirus pandemic.

Other famous bands to have played Ruisrock are Colosseum (1970), Family (1970), The Kinks (1971), Canned Heat (1971), Fairport Convention (1971), The Jeff Beck Group (1971), Pink Fairies (1971), Uriah Heep (1972 and 1978), MC5 (1972), Lindisfarne (1972), Status Quo (1973), Nazareth (1974), Procol Harum (1974), Mahavishnu Orchestra (1975), The Sensational Alex Harvey Band (1976), Chuck Berry (1976), Thin Lizzy (1977), The Boomtown Rats (1978), The Clash (1979), The Jam (1980), The Selecter (1980), UB40 (1981), Girlschool (1981), U2 (1982), Whitesnake (1983), The Alarm (1984), Nina Hagen (1984), The Cure (1985), The Damned (1986), The Pretenders (1987), The Stranglers (1988), Tanita Tikaram (1989), Georgia Satellites (1989), Soundgarden (1990), Bob Dylan (1990), Midnight Oil (1990), Billy Idol (1991), Nirvana (1992), Faith No More (1993), Chris Isaak (1993), Jethro Tull (1993), Aerosmith (1994), Simple Minds (1995), Bon Jovi (1995), Blur (1996), Pulp (1996), Neil Young (1996),    David Bowie (1997), Sting (1997), Nick Cave and the Bad Seeds (1997), Pet Shop Boys (1997), Beastie Boys (1998), Jesus and Mary Chain (1998), Metallica (1999), Ministry (1999), Blondie (1999), Oasis (2000), Iron Maiden (2000), Lou Reed (2000), Hellacopters (2001), Kent (2002), Manic Street Preachers (2003), Dio (2003), The Cardigans (2003), Motörhead (2004), Stray Cats (2004), Hawkwind (2004), Within Temptation (2005), Rammstein (2005), New York Dolls (2006), Morrissey (2006), Tool (2006), Flogging Molly (2006), Saxon (2006), Opeth (2006), Billy Talent (2007), Interpol (2008), Primal Scream (2008), Bullet for My Valentine (2008), Anti-Flag (2008), Slipknot (2009), Volbeat (2009), Canned Heat (2010), Ozzy Osbourne (2010), NOFX (2010), The Specials (2010), Amon Amarth (2010), The National (2011), Nekromantix (2011), Paramore (2011), Suicidal Tendencies (2012), Pulp (2012), Bloc Party (2012), Amorphis (2013), The Sounds (2013), Editors (2013), The Offspring (2014), Suede (2014).

See also
List of historic rock festivals
List of music festivals

References

External links

Official website 
Official website in English
List of Ruisrock bands (in Finnish)

Culture in Turku
Rock festivals in Finland
Tourist attractions in Turku
Counterculture festivals
Music festivals established in 1970
Music festivals in Finland
Heavy metal festivals in Finland